The Nine Lives of Montezuma is a 1980 children's novel written by "Michael Morpurgo". It is about the exciting life of a farm cat called Montezuma who has many brushes with death.

Reception
Nine Lives has proved popular - '... a story to read to children, to encourage children to read, and because it is so well written, it is great fun for adults to read as well.'  
A review in Junior Bookshelf recommends it 'with confidence to cat-lovers of any age.'

See also

References

1980 British novels
Novels by Michael Morpurgo
British children's novels
Children's novels about animals
1980 children's books
British children's books
Books about cats